A mallet is a kind of hammer.
Mallet is also the proper US English term for a Polo stick.

Mallet may also refer to:

Places 
 Mallet, Paraná, a municipality in southern Brazil
 Mallet, Rio de Janeiro, a region in Rio de Janeiro, Brazil
 Mont Mallet, a mountain in France
 Mallet Creek (disambiguation), in Ohio, USA
 Mallet Ranch, a historic ranch in Texas, USA
 Mallet (crater), a crater on the Moon

Other uses 
 Mallet percussion, a percussion instrument
 Percussion mallet, the mallet used with a percussion instrument
 Mallet locomotive, a specific type of steam locomotive
 Mallet (surname) (including a list of people with the name)
 Mallet family, a French family of bankers and businessmen
 Mallet (software project), a collection of java code for natural language processing tasks
 Mallet, a common placeholder name for an attacker in computer security, see Alice and Bob
 Mallet, alternative term for marlock, a shrubby or small-tree form of Eucalyptus
 Mallet (habit), a small-tree form of Eucalyptus found in Western Australia
 Mallet Assembly, an autonomous honors program at the University of Alabama

See also
 Curry Mallet, England
 Shepton Mallet, England
 Malet
 Mallett, a surname
 Mullet (disambiguation)
 
fa:کوبه (ابهام‌زدایی)